Madison/Wabash was a station of the Chicago "L" (elevated) rapid transit system. It served the CTA's Brown, Green, Orange, Pink, and Purple Lines. From 1919 to 1963, it also served interurban trains of the North Shore Line.

There are no remnants of the Madison/Wabash station in the original location, but a large amount of the station was sold in pieces and preserved as art items.  The station was located at Madison Street and Wabash Avenue in the Chicago Loop.

Closure and demolition
Madison/Wabash closed on March 16, 2015, after Sunday service in the Loop ceased for the night. The entrances were boarded up by morning-time, and trains started bypassing the station when Monday morning service started. The station sat abandoned until demolition commenced in May 2015. During the weekend of May 23–24, 2015, the entire Inner Loop platform was completely removed. On June 6, 2015, the transfer bridge was completely removed. During the weekend of June 20–21, 2015, the entire Outer Loop platform was completely removed. From July to August 2015, the station house, the fare controls, and the mezzanine were removed. The Washington/Wabash station opened on August 31, 2017.

Gallery

References

External links

Madison/Wabash Station Page at Chicago-L.org
Madison Street entrance from Google Maps Street View

CTA Brown Line stations
CTA Green Line stations
CTA Orange Line stations
CTA Purple Line stations
CTA Pink Line stations
Historic American Engineering Record in Chicago
Railway stations in the United States opened in 1896
Railway stations closed in 2015
1896 establishments in Illinois
2015 disestablishments in Illinois
Former North Shore Line stations
Defunct Chicago "L" stations